A referendum on the use of industrial hemp was held in the United States Virgin Islands on 6 November 2012, alongside general elections. The proposal was approved by 57% of voters.

Background
On 21 August 2012 the Legislature of the Virgin Islands voted by 10–4 to pass a law on the use of industrial hemp (hemp with a low tetrahydrocannabinol content). Governor John de Jongh signed it into law on 11 September 2012.

Results

The unusually high number of blank votes was caused by the question being on the same ballot paper as the simultaneous general elections.

References

2012 referendums
2012 in the United States Virgin Islands
2012
2012 United States Virgin Islands elections